Alice Nutter (born Anne Holden; 10 July 1962) is a British musician, best known as part of the anarchist music group Chumbawamba, and writer for theatre, radio and television.

Early life
She was born in Burnley, Lancashire and attended Towneley High School.

Musical career
Nutter joined Chumbawamba in 1982, not long after the band formed, and took up residence in their squat in Armley. With her music and politics closely integrated, Nutter picketed during the 1984-85 miners' strike and the 1986 Wapping dispute. In 1997, the band had an international hit with their song "Tubthumping", on which Nutter was a vocalist. She performed with the band on numerous international television shows and at the 1998 BRIT Awards. Nutter left Chumbawamba in 2006 to start a new career as a playwright. In 2012, she returned to the band for "Going Going", their final live performance at the Leeds City Varieties.

Writing career
Her theatre work includes Foxes (2006) at the West Yorkshire Playhouse and Where's Vietnam? (2008) for Red Ladder Theatre Company at West Yorkshire Playhouse. Her radio work includes the afternoon play Snow In July (2008) for Radio 4 and the play My Generation (2012) for Radio 3. In 2013, My Generation was brought to the West Yorkshire Playhouse by its artistic director James Brining in the first full-scale, main-stage production of Nutter's work. In 2016, the West Yorkshire Playhouse in Leeds staged Nutter's play the Barnbow Canaries about women munition workers in Barnbow, Leeds, during the First World War. The factory the women were working in exploded one day in December 1915 and killed 35 and injured many more.

For television, Nutter has written an episode of Jimmy McGovern's series The Street (2007) and an episode of the BBC medical drama Casualty (2009). She has also written an episode of Moving On, Jimmy McGovern's series, Accused and period drama The Mill. Nutter wrote a biographical drama based on the life of the Mancunian comedian Bernard Manning, but cuts to the BBC4 budget led to the piece never being filmed.

In March 2014, Spanner Films announced that Nutter would be one of the writers for Undercovers, a television drama series about the undercover police officers who infiltrated the British activist scene for 50 years, and the women who unknowingly had long-term relationships and even children with the spies. The series was also written by Simon Beaufoy, and was to be produced by Tony Garnett. The project did not come to fruition, but she later worked on the FX series Trust with Beaufoy about the Getty family and the kidnapping of John Paul Getty III, broadcast on BBC2 in 2018. She is currently working on the development of another FX series with Beaufoy.

Personal life
She changed her name by deed poll, feeling "an affinity" to the woman accused and hanged as a result of the 17th century Pendle witch hunt.

Nutter is an atheist.

Writing credits

Awards and nominations

References

External links
 MBA Literary and Script Agents: Alice Nutter
 Alice Nutter interview
 

Living people
1962 births
People from Burnley
Chumbawamba members
British television writers
English dramatists and playwrights
English television writers
English screenwriters
British women television writers
English atheists
English anarchists